Dan Singhwala is a village in the Bathinda district of Punjab, India.

Villages in Bathinda district